AD 29 (XXIX) was a common year starting on Saturday (link will display the full calendar) of the Julian calendar. At the time, it was known as the Year of the Consulship of Geminus and Geminus (or, less frequently, year 782 Ab urbe condita). The denomination AD 29 for this year has been used since the early medieval period, when the Anno Domini calendar era became the prevalent method in Europe for naming years.

Events

By place

Roman Empire 
 Agrippina the Elder is exiled to the island of Pandataria, and her sons (except Caligula) are imprisoned by Lucius Aelius Sejanus.
 Aulus Plautius, later military leader of the invasion of Britain under Emperor Claudius, becomes suffect consul alongside Lucius Nonius Asprenas.

By topic

Religion 
 According to the Gospel of Luke (Luke 3:1-2), the ministries of John the Baptist and Jesus probably began in this year. Jesus baptized by John the Baptist.
 Jesus executed according to Roman Catholic tradition.

Deaths 
 Gaius Fufius Geminus, Roman plebeian tribune and consul
 Julia the Younger, granddaughter of Augustus (b. 19 BC)
 Livia, wife of Augustus and mother of Tiberius (b. 58 BC)
 Jesus. (b.5? BC)

References 

0029

als:20er#29